Sepia appelloefi is a species of cuttlefish native to the northwestern Pacific Ocean, specifically the Tsushima Strait and waters between Kyūshū and southern Honshū, Japan. It lives at a depth of up to 350 m.

Sepia appelloefi grows to a mantle length of 90 mm.

The type specimen was collected near Misaki, Japan and is deposited at the Zoologische Staatssammlung Muenchen.

References

External links

Cuttlefish
Molluscs described in 1910
Taxobox binomials not recognized by IUCN